Ill Na Na 2: The Fever was intended to be the fourth studio album by American rapper Foxy Brown. The album was scheduled to be released on May 6, 2003 by Bad Boy Records and Def Jam Recordings. However, the album was cancelled due to disagreements between Foxy Brown and Bad Boy CEO Sean Combs.

History
Brown began recording the follow-up album to her previous release Broken Silence in the summer of 2001. Early in April 2002, she decided to title it Ill Na Na 2: The Fever. Amid rumors that Brown wanted to leave Def Jam, the album was initially to be released on July 2, 2002. In the middle of that month, Sean Combs offered to be co-executive producer. With a tentative release date of November 19, the first single would be the remix of "Stylin'", featuring Loon, Birdman, N.O.R.E., and Brown's brother Gavin. With a delayed release to May 2003 and plans to produce the album more like her latest (Broken Silence) rather than her original Ill Na Na, Brown started working with R&B singers Anita Baker and Lauryn Hill on the album in early 2003, and "I Need A Man" became the lead single. On April 16, 2003, Brown announced in an interview on The Wendy Williams Show on New York City radio station WBLS that she decided to terminate work on the album; the album would have been released on May 6. It was confirmed by MTV that the album would contain collaborations with: Lauryn Hill, Anita Baker, Luther Vandross, Spragga Benz, Shabba Ranks, P. Diddy, Capone-N-Noreaga, Fox 5 & Kori and Ludacris.

On February 26, 2020 the album was leaked on iTunes and Apple Music. Foxy responded on Instagram by threatening to sue whoever leaked the shelved album. She deleted the post shortly after.

Track listing
Fever (featuring Anita Baker)
The Storm
Run & Hide
The Letter pt. 2 (featuring Luther Vandross)
Open Book
We Makin It
Ménage-á-Trois (featuring Ludacris)
Superfreak
Nasty (featuring P. Diddy)
How U Want It
Magnetic
Jumpin
Stylin' (featuring Baby, Loon, Capone-N-Noreaga)
Why
The Original
Raps Bible
Streets Love Me
Ice (featuring Nelly Furtado)
Get Off Me
Black Girl Lost
Watcha Gonna Do
Cruel Summer
Everyday People (featuring Lauryn Hill)
Memory Lane
Fan Love
B.K. Made Me
I Need a Man
Cradle 2 The Grave

Release 2021 :

 Open Book
 We Makin’ It
 How You Want It
 Magnetic 
 The Original
 Superfreak
 Memory Lane
 Why
 Jumpin’
 Black Girl Lost
 Rap’s Bible
 Fan Love
 Stylin’

References

Bad Boy Records albums
Foxy Brown (rapper) albums
Unreleased albums